Richard or Dick Hubbard may refer to:
Richard D. Hubbard (1818–1884), United States Representative and governor of Connecticut
Richard B. Hubbard (1832–1901), governor of Texas
Richie Hubbard (1932–2011), Canadian politician
Dick Hubbard (born 1946), New Zealand businessman and politician

See also
Hubbard (surname)